Chestermere, originally named Chestermere Lake, is a city in the Canadian province of Alberta, within Rocky View County. It is largely a commuter town of Calgary and is a member municipality of the Calgary Region. The city, which surrounds Chestermere Lake, was known as Chestermere Lake from 1977 to 1993.

History

Early settlement 
Prior to the 20th century, the area around what is now Chestermere Lake was settled by only a few farmers. When the Canadian Pacific Railway was established in the 1880s, more and more people came to settle in the west. To make farming more productive, settlers began to determine ways to irrigate their land. As a natural wetland, Chestermere Lake was considered to be perfect for use as a balancing pool for the Western Irrigation Block.  By 1907, a dam and canal system had been built, the wetland developed into a lake, and farmers began using the water for irrigation.

Summer village 
Following the irrigation development, the lake began to be used for recreation. People would lease land from the Western Irrigation District (WID) (which took control of the land from CPR in 1944), build cabins and stay on the lake during the summer months. In 1959, the Chestermere Cabin Owners Association (CCOA) was incorporated with approximately 50 members.  The CCOA held events, bought a fire truck for the community, worked to reduce pollution in the lake, planted trees, and arranged for electricity and natural gas for the cabins.

As more people began to live around Chestermere Lake, residents wanted to secure long-term leases. In 1975, the CCOA bought the land from the WID and then transferred it to the residents. By 1977, the lake boasted 120 permanent homes and gained official status as the Summer Village of Chestermere Lake on April 1, 1977.  As a summer village, the residents of Chestermere gained more political influence and were able to begin adding services and amenities or encouraging infrastructure and developments such as fire and protection services, improved roads, a community hall, street lights, a recreation centre, local businesses and a golf course.

Town 
By 1992, Chestermere's population had increased to 1,043 permanent residents. On March 1, 1993, the Summer Village of Chestermere Lake officially changed its status and name to the Town of Chestermere. Becoming a town gave the residents more local and political authority. The town continued developing amenities and services for residents and its population has grown to 17,203 residents as recorded by its 2014 municipal census. In late 2014, town council voted in favour of pursuing city status, which became effective January 1, 2015.

City 
Chestermere's town council voted to apply for city status on September 29, 2014 when it was the fastest growing Town in Alberta. It became Alberta's 18th city on January 1, 2015.

Geography

Neighbourhoods 
The city is organized into the following neighbourhoods.
Northeast
 The Cove
Northwest
 Westmere
 Westmere Commercial
 Lakepointe

Southwest
 Chesterview Estates
 The Beaches
 Lakeside Greens
 Lakeview Landing
 Rainbow Falls
 West Creek
 South Shore ( https://www.liveatsouthshore.com/ )
 Dawson's Landing ( https://liveindawsonslanding.ca/ ) 
 Chelsea ( https://chelseachestermere.com/ )
 Waterford ( https://lifeinwaterford.com/ )

Southeast
 Chestermere Estates
 East Lakeview Shores
 Estates of Chestermere
 Kinniburgh North
 Kinniburgh South
 Lake Ere Estates

Demographics 

Transportation 
Chestermere is accessible on land through Trans-Canada Highway (Alberta Highway 1) and Chestermere Boulevard / 17 Avenue SE (formerly signed as Alberta Highway 1A). By air, the city is accessible through Chestermere (Kirkby Field) Airport. Calgary Transit provides bus service into Chestermere during the morning and evening rush hours.

Attractions 
 Chestermere Lake – Chestermere is well known for its lake. In the summer, it is used for waterskiing, wakeboarding, fishing and a variety of other water sports. It also provides day use parks for launching boats and family areas for the enjoyment of the outdoors. Chestermere Lake is also home to the Calgary Yacht Club.
 Chestermere Water Festival – The Chestermere Water Festival is an annual celebration of summer at the lake.
Biking and skateboarding – Chestermere is connected to the Calgary bicycle pathway system at the south end of West Chestermere
 Winter Festival – The Chestermere Winter Festival is an annual celebration of winter in a small city.
 Chestermere Drive (by the canal) and has bike trails surrounding the lake, a BMX park and a skate park.
 Lakeside Greens Golf Course in Chestermere is a semi-private 18 hole golf course.
 Camp Chestermere is a Christian camp located on the southeast end of Chestermere Lake.

Education 
The public schools in the city are Chestermere High School, Chestermere Lake Middle School, Prairie Waters Elementary School, East Lake School and Rainbow Creek Elementary School. Public schools in the city are run by the Rocky View School Division, which includes several other communities surrounding Calgary.

For publicly funded Catholic education, the city falls within the jurisdiction of the Calgary Catholic School District, which runs the St. Gabriel the Archangel school for grades 7-12 and Our Lady of Wisdsom school for grade K-6.

Most educational needs beyond this (e.g. post-secondary education) are met within Calgary.

Contemporary issues 
Although Chestermere is considered a separate municipality in its own right, its proximity to Calgary has led to occasional questions regarding possible future absorption by Calgary as it grows.

On August 1, 2007, the City of Calgary annexed an extensive tract of land from Rocky View County, which placed Calgary's eastern city limits one section (1.6 km or 1 mi) from the Chestermere's western city limits.

Meanwhile, Chestermere's March 2007 Growth Study proposed annexation of, among other areas, the intervening land between Chestermere and the newly expanded Calgary boundaries.  On March 13, 2009, Chestermere's annexation was approved resulting in a shared municipal boundary with Calgary.

See also 
List of cities in Alberta
List of communities in Alberta

References

External links 

1977 establishments in Alberta
Calgary Region
Cities in Alberta
Rocky View County
Former summer villages in Alberta